Iidva Nature Reserve is a nature reserve which is located in Järva County, Estonia.

The protected area was founded in 2006 to protect valuable habitat types and threatened species in Änari village (Türi Parish) and Piiumetsa and Roovere village (both in former Väätsa Parish).

References

Nature reserves in Estonia
Geography of Järva County